Kambiz Atabay (born 2 February 1939) is an Iranian former football administrator who serves as the private secretary to Her Majesty Farah Pahlavi's office in New York.

He was also an athlete and administrator who was President of Asian Football Confederation from 1 August 1976 until his resignation on 9 December 1978. He was also President of Football Federation of Iran from 17 October 1972 to 17 February 1979.

References

External links
Official FIFA website
Official AFC website

1939 births
Living people
People from Tehran
Association football executives
Iranian sports executives and administrators
Presidents of the Asian Football Confederation
Presidents of Iranian Football Federation
Iranian emigrants to the United States